German language translations of the Bible have existed since the Middle Ages. The most influential is Luther's translation, which established High German as the literary language throughout Germany by the middle of the seventeenth century and which still continues to be most widely used in the German-speaking world today.

Pre-Lutheran Germanic Bibles

The earliest known and partly still available Germanic version of the Bible was the fourth century Gothic translation of Wulfila (c. 311–380). This version, translated primarily from the Greek, established much of the Germanic Christian vocabulary that is still in use today. Later Charlemagne promoted Frankish Bible translations in the 9th century. There were Bible translations present in manuscript form at a considerable scale already in the thirteenth and the fourteenth century (e.g. the New Testament in the Augsburger Bible of 1350 and the Old Testament in the Wenceslas Bible of 1389). There are still approximately 1,000 manuscripts or manuscript fragments of Medieval German Bible translations extant.

Printed Bibles
There is ample evidence for the general use of the entire vernacular German Bible in the fifteenth century.  In 1466, before Martin Luther was even born, Johannes Mentelin printed the Mentel Bible, a High German vernacular Bible, at Strasbourg. This edition was based on a no-longer-extant fourteenth-century manuscript translation of the Vulgate from the area of Nuremberg. By 1518, it had been reprinted at least 13 times.

The Sensenschmidt Bible was published around 1476‒1478. In 1478–1479, two Low German Bible editions were published in Cologne, one in the Low Rhenish dialect and another in the Low Saxon dialect. In 1483, the Koberger was printed . In 1494, another Low German Bible was published in the dialect of Lübeck, and in 1522, the last pre-Lutheran Bible, the Low Saxon Halberstadt Bible was published.

In 1477, in Delft, Holland, an Old Testament (except the Psalms) was printed in Middle Dutch. An accompanying New Testament seems to have been lost.

In total, there were at least eighteen complete German Bible editions, ninety editions in the vernacular of the Gospels and the readings of the Sundays and Holy Days, and some fourteen German Psalters by the time Luther first published his own New Testament translation. An Anabaptist translation by Ludwig Hetzer and Hans Denck was published at Worms in 1529.

Overview of the German Bibles before Luther

Luther's Bible

The most important and influential translation of the Bible into German is the Luther Bible, completed in 1534. It was the first translation (mainly) from the original Hebrew and Greek and not translated from the Latin Vulgate. The influence that Martin Luther's translation had on the development of the German language is often compared to the influence the King James Version had on English. The Luther Bible is currently used in a revised version from 1984, which was adapted to the new German orthography in 1999. Here also some revisions have taken place, e.g. "Weib" > "Frau". Despite the revisions, the language is still somewhat archaic and difficult for non-native speakers who want to learn the German language using a German translation of the Bible. Another revision was published in 2017; in this version, some of the text that had been 'toned down' in previous revisions has been reverted to Luther's stronger formulations.

Froschauer Bible
Zwingli's translation grew out of the Prophezey, an exegetical workshop taking place on every weekday, with the participation of all clerics of Zürich, working at a German rendition of Bible texts for the benefit of the congregation. The translation of Martin Luther was used as far as it was already completed. This helped Zwingli to complete the entire translation five years before Luther. At the printing shop of Christoph Froschauer, the New Testament appeared from 1525 to 1529, and later parts of the Old Testament, with a complete translation in a single volume first printed in 1531, with an introduction by Zwingli and summaries of each chapter. This Froschauer Bible, containing more than 200 illustrations, became notable as a masterpiece of printing at the time. The translation is mainly due to Zwingli and his friend Leo Jud, pastor at the St. Peter parish. The translation of the Old Testament was revised in 1540, that of the New Testament in 1574. Verse numbering was introduced in 1589.

Other translations after Luther's
A Reformed translation by Johannes Piscator was published at Herborn from 1602 to 1604. Johannes Crellius (1599–1633) and Joachim Stegmann, Sr., did a German version of the Socinians' Racovian New Testament, published at Raków in 1630. A Jewish translation of the Tanakh by Athias was published in 1666, and reprinted in the Biblia Pentapla at Hamburg in 1711.

In 1526, Beringer's translation of the New Testament was published at Speyer. In 1527, Hieronymus Emser did a translation of the New Testament based on Luther's translation and the Vulgate. In 1534, Johann Dietenberger, OP, used Emser's New Testament and Leo Jud's translation of the deuterocanonical books in a complete Bible published at Mainz; both Emser's and Dietenberger's prose partly followed the style of the pre-Lutheran translations. The Dietenberger Bible was published in various revisions. Kaspar Ulenberg's revision was published at Mainz in 1617, and at Cologne in 1630. Ulenberg's revision was the basis for the "Catholic Bible," the revision by Jesuit theologians published at Mainz in 1661, 1662, and so on. Th. Erhard, OSB, did a revision published at Augsburg in 1722, which was in its sixth edition by 1748. G. Cartier's revision was published at Konstanz in 1751. The revision by Ignatius von Weitenauer, SJ, was published at Augsburg in twelve volumes from 1783 to 1789.

Mendelssohn
Moses Mendelssohn (a.k.a. Moses ben Menahem-Mendel and Moses Dessau; 1729–86) translated part of the Torah into German, which was published in Amsterdam in 1778. The translation was honored by some Jews and Protestants, while some Jews banned it. The whole Pentateuch and Psalms was published in 1783, and was appreciated even in Christian circles. His version of the Song of Solomon was posthumously published in 1788.

Later Bible translations
Daniel Gotthilf Moldenhawer's translation was published in 1774, Simon Grynaeus' in 1776, and Vögelin's of the new testament in 1781.

Heinrich Braun, OSB, did a new translation of the Vulgate, published at Augsburg from 1788 to 1797. Johann Michael Feder's revision of this was published at Nuremberg in 1803. Feder's revision was the basis of Joseph Franz Allioli's revision, published at Landshut in 1830 and 1832, and often republished.
Dominic de Brentano translated the New Testament and the Pentateuch and Anton Dereser translated the rest of the Bible; this was published at Frankfurt in sixteen volumes from 1815 to 1828, and then was revised by Johann Martin Augustin Scholz and published in seventeen volumes from 1828 to 1837.

Wilhelm Martin Leberecht de Wette and Johann Christian Wilhelm Augusti did a translation that was published at Heidelberg from 1809 to 1814, and the revision by Wette was published from 1831 to 1833. Rabbi Michael Sachs worked with Arnheim and Füchs on a new translation of the Tenakh published at Berlin in 1838.

Loch and Reischl did a translation from the Vulgate, compared with the Hebrew, Aramaic, and Greek, published at Regensburg from 1851 to 1866.

Jehovah's Witnesses, however, released their first complete Bible called Neue-Welt-Übersetzung der Heiligen Schrift (New World Translation of the Holy Scriptures) in German in 1985. By the following year, in 1986, the Neue-Welt-Übersetzung der Heiligen Schrift—mit Studienverweisen (New World Translation of the Holy Scriptures—With References) was released. In 1989, a new edition was released with the same name as Neue-Welt-Übersetzung der Heiligen Schrift. The 1989 edition of the Bible is based on English 1984 edition of the New World Translation of the Holy Scriptures which was released at the “Kingdom Increase” District Conventions of Jehovah’s Witnesses on 1984 in United States. On February 2, 2019, one member of the Governing Body of Jehovah's Witnesses, released the revised edition of the New World Translation of the Holy Scriptures in German with a new name—Die Bibel. Neue-Welt-Übersetzung This Bible is based from the English 2013 revision of the New World Translation of the Holy Scriptures which was released at the 129th annual meeting of the Watch Tower Bible and Tract Society of Pennsylvania on October 5 and 6, 2013 in the Assembly Hall of Jehovah’s Witnesses, Jersey City, New Jersey, U.S.A. This newly revised edition in German includes the use of more modern and understandable language, clarified Biblical expression, appendixes, and many more.

Contemporary Bible translations
A modern German translation is the Catholic Einheitsübersetzung ("unified" or "unity translation"), so called because it was the first common translation used for all Catholic German-speaking dioceses.

Other well known German language Bible versions are: Zürcher Bibel, Elberfelder, Schlachter, Buber-Rosenzweig (OT only), Pattloch, Herder, Hoffnung für Alle (Hope for All), Die Gute Nachricht (The Good News), Gute Nachricht Bibel (Good News Bible, revision of "Gute Nachricht"), Bibel in gerechter Sprache (Bible in equitable language, i.e. non-sexist).

Notes

References
 .
 .

See also
 Deutsche Bibelgesellschaft
 Tseno Ureno
 Bibelarchiv Vegelahn: Bible translations in german
 Calov Bible
 Elector Bible
 Johann Albrecht Bengel

 
German literature